Chilliwack is a double album by the Canadian rock band Chilliwack, released in September 1971. It was their second album, and their second to be entitled Chilliwack.  It included the top-10 (in Canada) hit "Lonesome Mary".

Following the release of their previous album, the band were dropped by Parrot Records and bassist Glenn Miller departed the group temporarily.  Shortly thereafter, the group signed with A&M Records.

Track listing

 "Lonesome Mary" (Henderson) (2:59)
 "Eat" (Henderson) (3:13)
 "Rosie" (Lawrence, Henderson) (5:00)
 "Ridin'" (Lawrence, Henderson) (3:00)
 "Ride-Out" (Henderson) (4:51)
 "Always" (Henderson) (2:22)
 "Changing Reels" (Lawrence, Henderson) (13:38)
 "Music for a Quiet Time" (Lawrence, Henderson)
 "Shine" (5:30)
 "Claps/Chants" (2:37)
 "Whistle/Flute Pads" (2:09)
 "Antiphony" (5:29)
 "Traveling Music" (0:53)
 "Sleep Music" (2:08)
 "Night-Morning" (Lawrence, Henderson, Turney) (17:09)

Personnel
Chilliwack
 Bill Henderson -	guitar, piano, vocals
 Claire Lawrence -	bass, flute, keyboards, organ, saxophone, vocals, wind
 Ross Turney -	drums, organ
Technical 
 Chilliwack - arrangements, producer
 Stephen Barncard - engineer, producer
 Chuck Beeson - design
 Richard Bosworth - mixing assistant
 Ellen Burke -	technician
 Roland Young - art direction

1971 albums
Chilliwack (band) albums
A&M Records albums
Albums produced by Claire Lawrence
Albums produced by Bill Henderson (Canadian singer)
Albums produced by Stephen Barncard